The Belhaven Blazers are the athletic teams that represent Belhaven University, located in Jackson, Mississippi, in intercollegiate sports as a member of the Division III level of the National Collegiate Athletic Association (NCAA), primarily competing in the Collegiate Conference of the South (CCS) for most of its sports as a founding member since the 2022–23 academic year; while its football team competes in the USA South Athletic Conference (USA South). They were also a member of the National Christian College Athletic Association (NCCAA), primarily competing as an independent in the Mid-East Region of the Division I level. The Blazers previously competed in the D-III American Southwest Conference (ASC) from 2015–16 to 2021–22; in the Southern States Athletic Conference (SSAC; formerly known as Georgia–Alabama–Carolina Conference (GACC) until after the 2003–04 school year) of the National Association of Intercollegiate Athletics (NAIA) from 2010–11 to 2014–15; and in the Gulf Coast Athletic Conference (GCAC) from 2002–03 to 2009–10 (which they were a member on a previous stint from 1981–82 to 1999–2000).

Teams 
Belhaven competes in 15 intercollegiate varsity sports: Men's sports include baseball, basketball, cross country, football, golf, soccer, tennis and track & field; while women's sports include basketball, cross country, soccer, softball, tennis, track & field and volleyball.

National championships

Team

Baseball
Belhaven has had eight Major League Baseball Draft selections since the draft began in 1965.

Several undrafted Belhaven players have also played professional baseball.

Football

References

External links